Christophia callipterella is a species of snout moth in the genus Christophia. It was described by Ragonot in 1887. It is found in Turkmenistan.

References

Moths described in 1887
Phycitini